Church of Saint Nicetas may refer to:
 Church of Saint Nicetas, Moscow
 Church of Saint Nicetas, Yaroslavl, a Russian Orthodox church in Yaroslavl, Russia